Shafique N. Virani is Distinguished Professor of Islamic Studies at the Institute of Islamic Studies, University of Toronto. Having earned a master's degree in Islamic Studies from McGill University and a PhD from Harvard University, he has also served as faculty at Harvard University and Zayed University.

He has won several international awards, such as the 2001 Dissertation Award from the Foundation for Iranian Studies, the 2008 British-Kuwait Friendship Society Book Prize (for his The Ismailis in the Middle Ages), and the Farabi International Award (granted annually by the Iranian Ministry of Science).

In 2014, the American Academy of Religion named Virani the recipient of its Excellence in Teaching Award.

Publications

References

External links
 Academia.edu website
 Personal website

Farabi International Award recipients
Harvard University alumni
Harvard University faculty
Living people
McGill University Institute of Islamic Studies alumni
Academic staff of the University of Toronto
Year of birth missing (living people)
Academic staff of Zayed University